Lü Yuefeng (born 13 November 1995) is a Chinese professional footballer who plays for China League Two side Zhejiang Yiteng as a midfielder.

Club career
Lü started his professional football career in 2014 when he joined Chinese Super League side Zhejiang Yiteng. He made his senior debut on 15 April 2015, in a 1–0 FA Cup away loss to Anhui Litian. On 21 June 2015, he made his league debut in a 2–2 draw with Wuhan Zall, coming on as a substitute for Li Xin in the 86th minute.

On 3 September 2017, Lü moved abroad to Romanian first division side CFR Cluj where he was assigned to the reserve team who were allowed to participate in the Liga III division. He would go on to be loaned out to second-tier club Dacia Unirea Brăila for the 2018–19 Liga II season.

On 24 July 2020, Lü returned to Zhejiang Yiteng.

Career statistics
31 December 2020.

References

External links
LÜ YUEFENG at Soccerway.com

1995 births
Living people
Chinese footballers
Footballers from Wuhan
Association football midfielders
Chinese Super League players
China League One players
Dalian Professional F.C. players
Zhejiang Yiteng F.C. players
Liga I players
CFR Cluj players
Liga II players
AFC Dacia Unirea Brăila players
CS Luceafărul Oradea players
CS Pandurii Târgu Jiu players
Chinese expatriate footballers
Expatriate footballers in Romania
Chinese expatriate sportspeople in Romania